Mary Josephine "Mary Jo" Eustace (born May 1, 1962) is a Canadian actress, singer-songwriter, comedian, model, author, and sous-chef best known as co-host of the Canadian cooking TV series What's for Dinner?.

Early life
Eustace was born and raised in Toronto, Ontario. She attended Jarvis Collegiate Institute and McGill University studying English. She later graduated from George Brown College's culinary program.

Career
In 1994, Eustace recorded a solo musical album entitled Bone & Marrow.

In 1995 Eustace appeared on What's for Dinner?, on Life Network, co-hosting with Ken Kostick throughout its run during the late 1990s. From 2000 to 2001, Eustace served as a regular on Canada AM. In April 2007, Eustace reunited with Kostick as the original morning hosts of What's for Breakfast on new Toronto radio station PROUD FM, a station licensed to appeal to the city's LGBT community.  She stepped down from the show in June 2008, and subsequently co-hosted He Said, She Said with Ken and Mary Jo, a cooking show similar to What's for Dinner?, which debuted in July 2008 on W Network.

Eustace has also acted, appearing in one episode each of Forever Knight in 1995, The Newsroom in 1997 and Power Play in 2000, as well as the television movie What Kind of Mother Are You? (1996), the feature film That Old Feeling (2000) and the short film Break Dreams (2014).

  In addition to her book about the break-up of her marriage,

Personal life
Eustace married actor Dean McDermott on July 24, 1993. She moved to Los Angeles when McDermott went south to develop his acting career. They had one child, Jack Montgomery McDermott (born October 6, 1998) and were in the process of adopting a baby girl when McDermott began his affair with Tori Spelling. After 13 years of marriage, McDermott and Eustace divorced on February 12, 2006, and he married Spelling that May.  She later finished the adoption of her daughter Lola Eustace (born July 7, 2005) as a single parent. Although McDermott was awarded joint custody of their son Jack, Eustace moved back to Canada with her children. She returned to Los Angeles in 2008, and has been based there since.

References

External links
 
 

1962 births
Actresses from Toronto
Comedians from Toronto
Writers from Toronto
Musicians from Toronto
Canadian emigrants to the United States
Canadian women singer-songwriters
Female models from Ontario
Canadian film actresses
Canadian television chefs
Canadian radio hosts
Canadian television actresses
Canadian women comedians
Canadian cookbook writers
Canadian food writers
Living people
George Brown College alumni
Canadian women television personalities
Canadian women radio hosts
20th-century Canadian actresses
20th-century Canadian comedians
20th-century Canadian women singers
20th-century Canadian women writers
21st-century Canadian actresses
21st-century Canadian women singers
21st-century Canadian women writers
21st-century Canadian non-fiction writers
21st-century Canadian comedians
Canadian women chefs
Chefs from Toronto